Nelia delos Reyes Sancho-Liao (August 30, 1951 - September 1, 2022) was a Filipino beauty queen, model, activist and co-founder of Gabriela Women's Party, an organization named after the heroic Gabriela Silang that advocates for women’s rights.

Biography
Nelia Sancho was born to Rogelio Pechon (Canimo) Sancho, a lawyer from Botbot, Pandan, Antique and Rosario Martisano delos Reyes from Caticlan, Malay, Aklan.

Sancho joined Binibining Pilipinas in 1969, finishing first runner-up to Gloria Diaz, who became the first Filipina to be crowned Miss Universe. She was one of Pitoy Moreno’s favorite fashion models in the late 1960s when the Philippine Tourism Authority tapped her as the country’s representative to the 1971 Queen of the Pacific beauty pageant in Melbourne, Australia.

Despite winning the title of Queen of the Pacific in 1971, Nelia Sancho left the comforts of privileged life and became an activist at the onset of the First Quarter Storm and eventually joined the underground movement during Martial Law and was imprisoned. After being freed in the early 1980s, she co-founded the Gabriela Women's Party with fellow beauty queen/activist Maita Gomez.

Sancho ran for senator following the Edsa Revolution but lost. Thereafter, she continued her activism in progressive organizations advocating for women empowerment, nationalist development, and just compensation for Filipino Comfort Women of World War 2.

References

1951 births
2022 deaths